A list of films produced by the Bollywood film industry based in Mumbai in 1951:

1951
The ten highest-grossing films at the Indian Box Office in 1951:

Films

A-B

C-K

L-R

S-Z

References

External links
 Bollywood films of 1951 at the Internet Movie Database

1951
Bollywood
Films, Bollywood